A referendum on becoming an overseas territory was held in Martinique on 10 January 2010. The proposal was rejected by 79% of voters, with a turnout of 55%. A simultaneous referendum was rejected in French Guiana.

Background
French President Nicolas Sarkozy proposed the referendum after visiting the Caribbean island of Martinique in June 2009. The French overseas departments of Martinique and Guadeloupe had suffered prolonged general strikes in early 2009, due to low wages and standards of living.

Martiniquean voters were asked whether they wanted more power to be given to the local government based in Fort-de-France. Martinique was an overseas region and an overseas department of France, regulated by the article 73 of the French Constitution, giving it the same political status as metropolitan departments and regions. The proposed change would have led to it becoming an overseas collectivity, regulated by the article 74 of the French Constitution, similar to French Polynesia.

Results

References

External links
RFI: Martinique and Guyana vote on more autonomy

2010 in Martinique
2010 referendums
Referendums in Martinique
Autonomy referendums